Uļjana Larionovna Semjonova (born 9 March 1952) is a retired Latvian basketball player who competed for the Soviet Union.

Standing at least  Semjonova was the leading women's basketball player in the world in the 1970s and 1980s. Wearing a men's size 21 (US) / 58 (EU) shoe, she was known for having the largest feet ever in women's basketball. For almost all of her playing career, she played for TTT Riga, which was part of Daugava Voluntary Sports Society. With TTT, she won 15 championships in the Soviet Union and the European Champion's Cup 15 times. Semjonova was also very dominant in international play, winning two Olympic Gold medals while playing for the USSR in 1976 and 1980 and never lost a game in official international competition.

She was awarded the Order of the Red Banner of Labour in 1976, and in 1993 became the first non-US woman enshrined into the Basketball Hall of Fame. She was an inaugural member of the Women's Basketball Hall of Fame in the class of 1999. In 2007, she was enshrined in the FIBA Hall of Fame. During the 2007 Latvian sports personality of the year award ceremony, Semjonova received the Lifetime Contribution to Sport award.

References

External links

 
 
 
 Uljana Semjonova, the soviet paving roller of 2,13 meters www.abc.es/historia (Spanish)
 http://www.encancha.com/fotos/foto23810.html At Tintoretto Getafe in the 1987-88 league.
 
 
 Hoopedia bio

1952 births
Living people
People from Zarasai
Basketball players at the 1976 Summer Olympics
Basketball players at the 1980 Summer Olympics
FIBA Hall of Fame inductees
Latvian people of Russian descent
Latvian women's basketball players
Naismith Memorial Basketball Hall of Fame inductees
Olympic basketball players of the Soviet Union
Olympic gold medalists for the Soviet Union
Olympic medalists in basketball
People from Daugavpils Municipality
Russians in Latvia
Russian women's basketball players
Soviet women's basketball players
Medalists at the 1980 Summer Olympics
Medalists at the 1976 Summer Olympics